Carolyn Askren McCarty (born 1972) is an American psychologist. She is a research professor of pediatrics and adjunct research associate professor of psychology in the department of pediatrics at University of Washington (UW). McCarty is the director of research and development in adolescent medicine at UW. She was the lead author on a study about  health care resources available for suicidal teenagers. In 2000, McCarty completed a Ph.D. at University of California, Los Angeles. Her doctoral advisor was John R. Weisz.

References 

Living people
21st-century American women scientists
20th-century American women scientists
21st-century American scientists
21st-century American psychologists
American women psychologists
20th-century American psychologists
University of Washington faculty
American women academics
1972 births
University of California, Los Angeles alumni